is a Japanese novelist and manga story writer. Kanzaka is best known for writing the Slayers novels that were adapted into the hit anime series, OAV and manga spin-offs.

Works
 - light novels, manga
 - movie
 - ova
 - movie
 - ova
 - movie
 - light novels, TV series.
 - manga story (shōjo).
 - manga story (fantasy).
 - manga story (science fiction).
 - light novel (shōnen).

External links
 

1964 births
Japanese fantasy writers
Living people
People from Hyōgo Prefecture
Slayers